In the United States, each state has its own written constitution.

They are much longer than the United States Constitution, which only contains 4,543 words. State constitutions are all longer than 8,000 words because they are more detailed regarding the day-to-day relationships between government and the people. The shortest is the Constitution of Vermont, adopted in 1793 and currently 8,295 words long. The longest was Alabama's sixth  constitution, ratified in 1901, about 345,000 words long, but rewritten in 2022. Both the federal and state constitutions are organic texts: they are the fundamental blueprints for the legal and political organizations of the United States and the states, respectively.

The Bill of Rights provides that "The powers not delegated to the United States by the Constitution, nor prohibited by it to the States, are reserved to the States respectively, or to the people." The Guarantee Clause of Article 4 of the Constitution states that "The United States shall guarantee to every State in this Union a Republican Form of Government." These two provisions indicate states did not surrender their wide latitude to adopt a constitution, the fundamental documents of state law, when the U.S. Constitution was adopted.

Typically state constitutions address a wide array of issues deemed by the states to be of sufficient importance to be included in the constitution rather than in an ordinary statute. Often modeled after the federal Constitution, they outline the structure of the state government and typically establish a bill of rights, an executive branch headed by a governor (and often one or more other officials, such as a lieutenant governor and state attorney general), a state legislature, and state courts, including a state supreme court (a few states have two high courts, one for civil cases, the other for criminal cases). They also provide general governmental framework for what each branch is supposed to do and how it should go about doing it. Additionally, many other provisions may be included. Many state constitutions, unlike the federal constitution, also begin with an invocation of God.

Some states allow amendments to the constitution by initiative.

Many states have had several constitutions over the course of their history.

The territories of the United States are "organized" and, thus, self-governing if the United States Congress has passed an Organic Act. Two of the 14 territories without commonwealth status — Guam and the United States Virgin Islands — are organized, but haven't adopted their own constitutions. One unorganized territory, American Samoa, has its own constitution. The remaining 13 unorganized territories have no permanent populations and are either under direct control of the U.S. Government or operate as military bases.

The commonwealths of Puerto Rico and the Northern Mariana Islands (CNMI) do not have organic acts but operate under local constitutions. Pursuant to the acquisition of Puerto Rico under the Treaty of Paris, 1898, the relationship between Puerto Rico and the United States is controlled by Article IV of the United States Constitution. Constitutional law in the CNMI is based upon a series of constitutional documents, the most important of which are the 1976 Covenant to Establish a Commonwealth of the Northern Mariana Islands in political union with the United States of America, which controls the relationship between the CNMI and the United States; and the local commonwealth constitution, drafted in 1976, ratified by the people of the CNMI in March 1977, accepted by the United States Government in October 1977, and effective from 9 January 1978.



List of constitutions
The following is a list of the current constitutions of the states in the United States. Each entry shows the ordinal number of the current constitution, the official name of the current constitution, the date on which the current constitution took effect, and the estimated length of the current constitution. Also below are a description of organic instruments with respect to additional territory.

Note that constitutions of states that were independent countries prior to admission, and constitutions used by rebelling states participating in the American Civil War are not counted.

Federal district charter

The District of Columbia has a charter similar to charters of major cities, instead of having a constitution like the states and territories. The District of Columbia Home Rule Act establishes the Council of the District of Columbia, which governs the entire district and has certain devolved powers similar to those of major cities. Congress has full authority over the district and may amend the charter and any legislation enacted by the Council.
Attempts at statehood for the District of Columbia have included the drafting of three constitutions in 1982 1987, and 2016 all referring to the district as the "State of New Columbia".

Commonwealth and Territorial constitutions
 The Constitution of the Commonwealth of Puerto Rico, July 25, 1952. It was ratified by Puerto Rico's electorate in a referendum on March 3, 1952, approved by the United States Congress.
 The Constitution of the Commonwealth of the Northern Mariana Islands was drafted by thirty-nine elected delegates meeting in a constitutional convention on Saipan in 1976. Their proposed constitution was subsequently ratified by Northern Mariana Islands voters on March 6, 1977, and became effective January 9, 1978. Pursuant to the provisions of Section 202 of the Covenant, the Constitution of the Northern Mariana Islands was deemed to have been approved by the Government of the United States six months after the date of submission to the president. The six-month period having expired on October 22, 1977, President Carter issued a proclamation announcing the Constitution of the Northern Mariana Islands was deemed approved.
 The Constitution of the Territory of American Samoa was signed by 68 members of the 1960 constitutional convention and was approved by United States Secretary of the Interior Fred Andrew Seaton on 27 April 1960. It became effective 17 October 1960. Several amendments to the Constitution were approved in a referendum in the general elections in 1966, subsequently by Secretary of the Interior Stewart Udall on 2 June 1967, and became effective 1 July 1967.

Organic acts
 The Territory of Guam does not have its own constitution, but operates under the Guam Organic Act of 1950 and other federal statutes.
 The United States Virgin Islands, an unincorporated organized territory, does not have its own constitution, instead operating under various federal statutes. See politics of the United States Virgin Islands.

See also
 State constitution gubernatorial qualifications in the United States
 State constitution (Australia)

Notes

References

Further reading
 Bryce, James, viscount. The American Commonwealth (2nd ed., rev.; London: Macmillan and Co., 1891), vol. 1, p. [413]-445, [683]-724, et passim.
 Hammons, Christopher W. (1999). Was James Madison wrong? Rethinking the American preference for short, framework-oriented constitutions. American Political Science Review. Dec. 1999.
 The appendices to this article contain substantial data on state constitutions.
Robinson Woodward-Burns. 2021. Hidden Laws: How State Constitutions Stabilize American Politics. Yale University Press.

External links

The Green Papers: Constitutions of the states
The Green Papers: State constitutions, an explanation
The Green Papers: Links to state constitutions
Citings of Religious Influence in First State Constitutions

 
State government in the United States
Constitutions of country subdivisions